United Nations Security Council resolution 763, adopted without a vote on 6 July 1992, after examining the application of the Republic of Georgia for membership in the United Nations, the Council recommended to the General Assembly that Georgia be admitted.

See also
 Member states of the United Nations
 List of United Nations Security Council Resolutions 701 to 800 (1991–1993)

References

External links
 
Text of the Resolution at undocs.org

 0763
 0763
 0763
July 1992 events
1992 in Georgia (country)